Talking to the Dead is a compilation album released by Rosemary's Babies on October 5, 2004, on Ghastly Records.
It features nine of the 10 tracks released in 1983 on the Blood Lust EP.

Track listing
 "What I Hate" - 0.14
 "Talking to the Dead" - 1.14
 "Sex Maniac" - 1.03
 "One Dead Low-Life" - 0.34
 "I Vote Yes" - 1.50
 "Happy Song" - 1.53
 "Attack of the 50ft Cowboy" - 1.00
 "Sounds of Death" - 1.51
 "I'm Gonna Be Sick" - 1.17
 "You Just Don't Rate" - 1.10
 "Alice in Murderland" - 1.25
 "That's Alright, That's O.K." - 0.57
 "Let's Molest 10yr. Olds" - 1.38
 "Fake Babies" - 1.03
 "Dead Zone" - 1.08
 "Small Minds, Think Small" - 0.54
 "Becky Bondage" - 0.44
 "Inferior" - 0.46
 "Blood Lust" - 0.43
 "The Green Hornet Theme" - 1.30
 "Fake Babies" (live May 15, 1983 @ CBGB's) - 1.04
 "Alice in Murderland" (live May 15, 1983 @ CBGB) - 1.13
 "Talking to the Dead" (live May 15, 1983 @ CBGB) - 1.04
 "That's Alright, That's O.K." (live May 15, 1983 @ CBGB) - 0.54
 "Small Minds, Think Small" (live May 15, 1983 @ CBGB) - 0.58
 "Sounds Of Death" (instrumental) - 3.02

References

Rosemary's Babies albums
2004 compilation albums